Island in the Sky  is a 1938 drama directed by Herbert I. Leeds, starring Gloria Stuart and Michael Whalen.

Plot

Julie Hayes (Gloria Stuart) is betrothed to Michael Fraser (Michael Whalen), assistant district attorney. Peter Vincent (Robert Kellard) is falsely convicted of murder of his father Stephen Vincent and is condemned to death, Julie postpones her wedding to prove him innocent. She enlists the help of Johnny Doyle (Paul Kelly), a former gangster, and eventually succeeds in saving the innocent man's life.

Cast
 Gloria Stuart as Julie Hayes
 Michael Whalen as Michael Fraser
 Paul Kelly as Johnny Doyle
 Robert Kellard as Peter Vincent
 June Storey as Lucy Rhodes
 Paul Hurst as Happy
 Leon Ames as Marty Butler
 Willard Robertson as Walter Rhodes
 George Humbert as Peter Trompas
 Aggie Herring as Mrs. Maggie O'Shea
 Charles D. Brown as Inspector Whitehead

References

External links 
 
 
 
 

1938 drama films
1938 films
20th Century Fox films
American drama films
American black-and-white films
Films based on short fiction
Films directed by Herbert I. Leeds
1930s English-language films
1930s American films
Films with screenplays by Maurice Rapf